Vreemde Wêreld is a 1974 South African German bilingual crime drama film written and directed by Jürgen Goslar. The plot of the film was adopted from a novel titled "Entmündint" which was written by a popular novelist Heinz G. Konsalik.

Cast 
 Sandra Prinsloo as Gisela Pelzer
 Wolfgang Kieling as Iwan Elzer
 Ian Yule
 Brian O'Shaughnessy as Dr. Page
 Marius Weyers as Clark Burton
 Richard Loring as George Harding
 Siegfried Mynhardt as Professor von Maggfelt
 Cobus Rossouw as Dr. Vrobel

References

External links 

 

1974 films
1974 crime drama films
South African crime drama films
German crime drama films
West German films
Afrikaans-language films
1970s German-language films
Films shot in South Africa
Films based on German novels
1974 multilingual films
German multilingual films
1970s German films